The 2015–16 Cymru Alliance League Cup (also known as the Huws Gray Cup) is the 26th edition of the competition.

First round

Second round

Semi-finals

Final

See also 
 Cymru Alliance League Cup

2015–16 in Welsh football